Hawaii Pacific University (HPU) is a private university in downtown Honolulu, Makapuʻu and Kāneʻohe, Hawaii.  HPU is the largest private university in the central Pacific, most noted for its diverse student body of nearly 5,000 students, representing nearly 65 countries. The school's top academic programs are in Business Administration, Nursing, Biology, Diplomacy and Military Studies, and Social Work. HPU offers the only Doctor of Physical Therapy program in the state of Hawaiʻi. 

Oceanic Institute of HPU, an aquaculture research facility, is located at Makapuu Point. HPU is also present on military installations on the island of Oahu.

History 
HPU was founded in 1965 as Hawaii Pacific College by Paul C.T. Loo, Eureka Forbes, Elizabeth W. Kellerman, and Reverend Edmond Walker. Wanting a private liberal arts college in Honolulu, the four prominent and public-spirited citizens applied for a charter of incorporation for a not-for-profit corporation to be called Hawaii Pacific College. The state of Hawaii granted a charter of incorporation to Hawaii Pacific on September 17, 1965.

In September 1966, Honolulu Christian College established in 1949 merged into Hawaii Pacific College, and a new charter was granted by the state of Hawaii.

In 1967, James L. Meader became Hawaii Pacific College's first President. President Meader, in consultation with community leaders, developed a comprehensive educational program.

When President Meader retired on June 30, 1968, the Board of Trustees elected the Reverend George A. Warmer as Hawaii Pacific's second President. Under President Warmer's leadership, the College implemented academic programs in the liberal arts and cooperative education.

In 1972, Hawaii Pacific College graduated seven students in its first commencement class and in the same year established a School of Business Administration. Chatt G. Wright became the founding Dean of Hawaii Pacific's new School of Business Administration.

In 1973, the College received full accreditation from the Western Association of Schools and Colleges. The following years saw the creation of the English Foundations Program, offering instruction to non-native speakers of English, and the Division of Special Programs, administering off-campus instruction on various military installations on Oahu.

President Warmer retired in 1976, and Chatt G. Wright became Hawaii Pacific's third President. Under President Wright's leadership, Hawaii Pacific continued to expand and develop through the 1980s. Augmenting its undergraduate program of baccalaureate and associate degrees, Hawaii Pacific launched a Master of Business Administration program in 1986, a Master of Science in Information Systems program in 1989, and a Master of Arts in Human Resource Management in 1991.

Hawaii Pacific became Hawaii Pacific University (HPU) in 1990.

In 1992, Hawaii Loa College, a small, independent, liberal arts college located on the windward side of Oahu, merged into Hawaii Pacific University.

In 2004, the HPU International Vocal Ensemble made their Carnegie Hall debut where they performed Morten Lauridsen's Lux Aeterna and O Magnum Mysterium.

In 2011, President Chatt G. Wright retired and Geoffrey Bannister, Ph.D., became HPU's fourth President on July 1. Born in the United Kingdom and raised in New Zealand, Bannister received his Ph.D. in Geography from the University of Toronto (Canada) and previously served as President of Butler University in Indianapolis, Indiana.

In January 2013, the Aloha Tower Development Corporation (ATDC) consented to the University's ownership and management of the Aloha Tower Marketplace. The approvals passed by ATDC were essential to Hawai'i Pacific's plan to move forward in redeveloping the Marketplace into a mixed-use property featuring outstanding student housing, retail and dining businesses and community gathering spaces.

HPU completed a merger to bring Oceanic Institute formally into the university in January 2014.

In June 2014, HPU held a ceremonial groundbreaking and traditional Hawaiian blessing at Aloha Tower Marketplace, marking the official start of revitalizing this iconic waterfront destination.

The $50 million Aloha Tower Marketplace revitalization project was completed in August 2015, opening to students and the community. Aloha Tower Marketplace serves as an anchor for the university's core downtown Honolulu campus, including a first-class center for higher education and university housing integrated within a dynamic community gathering and retail space.

On July 1, 2016, John Yukio Gotanda, J.D., took office as Hawaii Pacific University's fifth president. Born and raised in Hawaii President Gotanda returns home to lead HPU, following a successful 30-year career on the East Coast. He most recently served as the dean of Villanova University School of Law and earlier in his career practiced at law firms in Boston and D.C., and was an attorney for the US Court of Appeals.

Campus

Aloha Tower Marketplace and Downtown Honolulu Campus 
HPU's Aloha Tower Marketplace serves as an anchor for HPU in the downtown area. Aloha Tower Marketplace is a mixed-use facility that includes student housing, HPU's Welcome Center, Learning Commons, Lounge, Student Café, Student Fitness Center, ESports Arena, and a variety of restaurants, businesses, classrooms, and meeting rooms for university and community use.

HPU's athletic department is centrally located in Honolulu's business district, and it is a few blocks' walk to the state capitol. HPU's College of Business, which is headquartered in Pioneer Plaza, includes computer based classrooms along with meeting spaces. In 2016, HPU opened its downtown INBRE (IDeA Networks of Biomedical Research Excellence) research labs, providing students with biomedical instrumentation and laboratory facilities.

Hawaii Loa Campus

The Hawaii Loa campus, commonly referred to as HLC, is located eight miles away from the downtown campus, near Castle Junction in Kāneohe, on the windward side of the Koolau Range. HLC was originally built by Hawaii Loa College, a liberal arts school that was merged into Hawaii Pacific University in 1992. This campus houses the natural sciences, nursing, public health, and social work programs, however, other general courses are offered at HLC. The name "Hawaii Loa" refers to the Polynesian navigator, Hawaiiloa, who is credited in folklore with the discovery of the islands.

Oceanic Institute 
The Oceanic Institute (OI) of HPU is a  research facility focused on the advancement of sustainable aquaculture technologies. OI of HPU is located on a 56-acre site at Makapuu Point on the windward coast of Oahu. OI conducts research, education, and training that focuses on marine aquaculture, aquatic feeds and nutrition, and coastal resource management. In 2013, OI of HPU commissioned a teaching laboratory to complement classroom and conference space at OI of HPU's Ocean Learning Center (OLC). The OLC annex supports biotechnology research and education with two research labs, a teaching lab, and a distance learning center

Military programs 
HPU's Military Campus Programs (MCP) operates full-service campuses on Oahu's US military bases, including Pearl Harbor, Hickam Air Force Base, Tripler Army Medical Center, Camp H. M. Smith, Schofield Barracks, and Kaneohe Marine Corps Base Hawaii.

Academics 
Hawaii Pacific University is made up of the following colleges: the College of Business, College of Liberal Arts, College of Health and Society, College of Natural and Computational Sciences, and the College of Professional Studies. HPU offers both undergraduate and graduate programs in each of its colleges and schools.

The university also has an extensive distance learning and online-based platform for many of its programs. HPU also has an extensive Study Abroad and Student Exchange Program.

The student to faculty ratio is 12 to 1.

Hawaii Pacific University is regionally accredited by the Western Association of Schools and Colleges (WASC) and received a reaffirmation of its accreditation in 2016, extending to 2022. The School of Education has received accreditation for its B.Ed. and M.Ed. degree programs by the Council for the Accreditation of Educator Preparation. The Nursing Program's BSN and MSN degrees are approved by the Hawaii Board of Nursing and is accredited by the Commission on Collegiate Nursing Education. The Social Work Program's BSW and MSW degrees are accredited by the Council on Social Work Education.

Notable faculty 
 Neil Everett, co-anchor of ESPN's SportsCenter, former athletic administrator for 15 years.
 Matthew LoPresti, Ph.D., Associate Professor of Philosophy and Humanities and Chair of the Asian Studies Program, and a former Democratic member of the Hawaii House of Representatives.

Athletics 

The university's athletic teams are called the Sharks. They compete in the Pacific West Conference as part of the National Collegiate Athletic Association's Division II. Hawaii Pacific University's first venture into intercollegiate athletics came with the formation of the men's basketball team. The university previously competed in the National Association of Intercollegiate Athletics before joining the NCAA in the mid-1990s.

Notable alumni 
Benny Agbayani, retired professional baseball player
Kiwi Camara, defense lawyer of Capitol Records, Inc. v. Thomas-Rasset
Lymaraina D'Souza, Miss India 1998
Tulsi Gabbard, American politician, former United States Representative for Hawaii's 2nd congressional district and candidate for President
Radasha Hoohuli, Miss Hawaii USA 2006
Jeff Hubbard, professional bodyboarder
Christopher Loeak, President, Republic of the Marshall Islands.
Saige Martin, artist and politician, first openly gay and Latinx person to serve on the Raleigh City Council
James D. McCaffrey, software engineer and author
Sarah Palin, U.S. politician, attended one semester in 1982 at Hawaii Pacific College.
Chad Rowan, also known as Akebono (Taro), sumo Grand Champion Yokozuna and professional and K-1 wrestler, played varsity basketball for HPU
Carolyn Sapp, Miss America 1992
Eun Ji Won, member of the former K-pop band Sechs Kies
Vivian Wu, Chinese actress, known for her roles in The Last Emperor (1987), Heaven & Earth (1993), The Joy Luck Club (1993), and The Pillow Book (1996) and as the historical figure of Soong Mei-ling, commonly referred to as Madam Chiang Kai-shek, in The Soong Sisters (1997 film) and The Founding of a Republic (2009 film).

References

External links
 
 Hawaii Pacific Athletics website

 

 
1965 establishments in Hawaii
Buildings and structures in Honolulu
Education in Honolulu
Educational institutions established in 1965
Schools accredited by the Western Association of Schools and Colleges
Private universities and colleges in Hawaii